Justice Wheeler may refer to:

Christine Wheeler (born 1954), justice of the Supreme Court of Western Australia
George W. Wheeler (1860–1932), chief justice of the Supreme Court of Connecticut
Hoyt Henry Wheeler (1833–1906), associate justice of the Vermont Supreme Court
Royall T. Wheeler (1810–1864), chief justice of the Supreme Court of Texas
Stephen Morse Wheeler (1900–1967), associate justice of the New Hampshire Supreme Court

See also
Thomas C. Wheeler (born 1948), judge of the United States Court of Federal Claims